Lapara is a genus of moths in the family Sphingidae. The genus was erected by Francis Walker in 1856.

Species
Lapara bombycoides Walker, 1856
Lapara coniferarum (J. E. Smith, 1797)
Lapara halicarnie Strecker, 1880
Lapara phaeobrachycerous Brou, 1994

References

Sphingini
Moth genera
Taxa named by Francis Walker (entomologist)